The 2014–15 Washington Huskies women's basketball team will represent University of Washington during the 2014–15 NCAA Division I women's basketball season. The Huskies, led by second year head coach Mike Neighbors, play their home games at Alaska Airlines Arena and were a members of the Pac-12 Conference. They finished the season 23–10, 11–7 in Pac-12 play to finish in fifth place. They advanced to the quarterfinals of the Pac-12 women's tournament where they lost to California. They received at-large bid of the NCAA women's basketball tournament, which was their first trip to the NCAA Women's Tournament for the first time since 2007. They lost to Miami (FL) in the first round.

Previous season

The Washington Huskies finished the 2013–14 season with an overall record of 20–14, with a record of 10–8 in the Pac-12 regular season. In the 2014 Pac-12 Tournament, the Huskies were defeated by Utah, 65–53 in the First round. They lost in the quarterfinals in the 2014 Women's National Invitation Tournament to UTEP, 70–63.

Departures

2014 Recruiting Class

Roster

Schedule

|-
!colspan=9 style="background:#363c74; color:#e8d3a2;" | Exhibition

|-
!colspan=12 style="background:#363c74; color:#e8d3a2;"| Non-conference regular season

|-
!colspan=12 style="background:#363c74; color:#e8d3a2;"| Pac-12 regular season

|-
!colspan=9 style="background:#363c74;" | 2015 Pac-12 Conference Women's Tournament

|-
!colspan=9 style="background:#363c74;" | NCAA Women's Tournament

Rankings

See also
 2014–15 Washington Huskies men's basketball team

References

Washington Huskies women's basketball seasons
Washington
2014 in sports in Washington (state)
2015 in sports in Washington (state)